The Europe/Africa Zone was one of the three zones of the regional Davis Cup competition in 1999.

In the Europe/Africa Zone there were four different tiers, called groups, in which teams competed against each other to advance to the upper tier. The top two teams in Group III advanced to the Europe/Africa Zone Group II in 2000, whereas the bottom two teams were relegated to the Europe/Africa Zone Group IV in 2000.

Participating nations

Draw
 Venue: Gezira Sporting Club, Cairo, Egypt
 Date: 24–28 February

Group A

Group B

1st to 4th place play-offs

5th to 8th place play-offs

Final standings

  and  promoted to Group II in 2000.
  and  relegated to Group IV in 2000.

Round robin

Group A

Algeria vs. Tunisia

Ghana vs. Luxembourg

Algeria vs. Luxembourg

Ghana vs. Tunisia

Algeria vs. Ghana

Luxembourg vs. Tunisia

Group B

Egypt vs. Bosnia and Herzegovina

Benin vs. Nigeria

Egypt vs. Benin

Bosnia and Herzegovina vs. Nigeria

Egypt vs. Nigeria

Benin vs. Bosnia and Herzegovina

1st to 4th place play-offs

Semifinals

Bosnia and Herzegovina vs. Luxembourg

Egypt vs. Tunisia

Final

Egypt vs. Luxembourg

3rd to 4th play-off

Bosnia and Herzegovina vs. Tunisia

5th to 8th place play-offs

5th to 8th play-offs

Ghana vs. Nigeria

Algeria vs. Benin

5th to 6th play-off

Benin vs. Nigeria

7th to 8th play-off

Algeria vs. Ghana

References

External links
Davis Cup official website

Davis Cup Europe/Africa Zone
Europe Africa Zone Group III